Kidtonik (also stylized as KidToniK) was a French singing group formed of six members in 2008 by the French children's television channel Canal J.

History 
The members of the group were chosen by viewers of the French children's television channel Canal J during its 2008 TV season. After that, the group was signed to the label Heben Music. In July 2008, it released a single titled "Aller plus loin". It was placed very high in the French charts and continued to sell well during that year's summer season.

In October, the group was again in the top 10 in France with the single "Left & Right" (number 6), and then it released its first album, Aller plus loin, followed by another single from the album — "Jusqu'au bout", which entered the French charts in December and spent three weeks in the top 10 in January.

Members 
 Morgane Goffard
 Alexis Durand
 Joanna Miles
 Oihana Lob
 Sarah Michelle
 Robin Livin
Aurélien Langlois

Discography

Albums

Singles

References

External links 
 
 Selected official music videos
 
 

French musical groups
Child musical groups
Musical groups established in 2008
Musical groups disestablished in 2011